The 15th Connecticut Infantry Regiment was an infantry regiment that served in the Union Army during the American Civil War.

Service
The 15th Connecticut Infantry Regiment was organized at New Haven, Connecticut, on August 25, 1862.

The regiment was attached to Casey's Provisional Brigade, Military District of Washington, to October 1862. 1st Brigade, Casey's Division, Military District Washington to December 1862. 2nd Brigade, 3rd Division, IX Corps, Army of the Potomac, to April 1863. 2nd Brigade, 2nd Division, VII Corps, Department of Virginia, to July 1863. 2nd Brigade, Getty's Division, Portsmouth, Virginia, Department of Virginia and North Carolina, to January 1864. District of the Albemarle, North Carolina, Department Virginia and North Carolina, to February 1864. Defenses of New Bern, North Carolina, Department of Virginia and North Carolina, to January 1865. Sub-district of New Bern, Department of North Carolina, to March 1865. 2nd Brigade, 2nd Division, District of Beaufort, North Carolina, Department of North Carolina, March 1865. 1st Brigade, 1st Division, District of Beaufort and District of New Bern, to June 1865.

The 15th Connecticut Infantry mustered out of service June 27, 1865, and was discharged July 12, 1865, at New Haven.

Detailed service
Left Connecticut for Washington, D.C., August 28, 1862. Duty in the defenses of Washington, D.C., until September 17, 1862. At Arlington Heights, Virginia, November 3. At Fairfax Seminary, Va., December 1. March to Fredericksburg, Va., December 1–6. Battle of Fredericksburg December 12–15. Burnside's 2nd Campaign, "Mud March," January 20–24, 1863. Moved to Newport News, Virginia, February 6–9, then to Suffolk March 13. Siege of Suffolk April 12–May 4. Edenton Road April 24. Providence Church Road, Nansemond River, May 3. Siege of Suffolk raised May 4. Reconnaissance to the Chickahominy June 9–17. Dix's Peninsula Campaign June 24–July 7. Expedition from White House to South Anna River July 1–7. Moved to Portsmouth, Virginia, and duty there January 1864. (Five companies moved to South Mills September 20, 1863.) Skirmish Harrellsville January 20, 1864 (detachment). Moved to New Bern, North Carolina, January 21, 1864, then to Plymouth, North Carolina, January 24. Expedition up Roanoke River January 29 (detachment). Windsor January 30 (detachment). Moved to New Bern February 3 and duty there March 1865. Expedition to near Kinston June 20–23, 1864. Southwest Creek June 22. Battle of Wyse Fork, where most of the regiment was captured, March 8–10, 1865. Occupation of Kinston, North Carolina March 14. Provost duty at Kinston and at New Bern June 1865.

Casualties
The regiment lost a total of 185 men during service; 4 officers and 34 enlisted men killed or mortally wounded, 5 officers and 142 enlisted men died of disease.

Commanders
 Colonel Dexter R. Wright
 Lieutenant Colonel Samuel Tolles

See also

 Connecticut in the American Civil War
 List of Connecticut Civil War units

References
 Dyer, Frederick H. A Compendium of the War of the Rebellion (Des Moines, IA: Dyer Pub. Co.), 1908.
 Sanford, W. S. "Soldiers' Welcome": A Poem Delivered in North Haven, July 19th, 1865 (New Haven, CT: Tuttle, Morehouse, & Taylor), 1865.

Attribution

Further reading
 Thorpe, Sheldon B. The History of the Fifteenth Connecticut Volunteers in the War for the Defense of the Union, 1861–1865. New Haven: The Price, Lee & Adkins Co, 1893.

External links
 

Military units and formations established in 1862
Military units and formations disestablished in 1865
Units and formations of the Union Army from Connecticut
Military in Connecticut
1862 establishments in Connecticut